Olympic Hockey may refer to
 Field hockey at the Summer Olympics
 Ice hockey at the Olympic Games
 Olympic Hockey Nagano '98, a Nintendo 64 video game